
Gmina Janów is a rural gmina (administrative district) in Sokółka County, Podlaskie Voivodeship, in north-eastern Poland.

The gmina contains part of the protected area called Knyszyń Forest Landscape Park.

History 
Since 13th age to 1795 Gmina Janów was part of Grand Duchy of Lithuania.

Population

Villages
Gmina Janów contains the villages and settlements of Białousy, Brzozowe Błoto, Budno, Budzisk-Bagno, Budzisk-Strużka, Chorążycha, Cieśnisk Mały, Cieśnisk Wielki, Cimoszka, Dąbrówka, Franckowa Buda, Gabrylewszczyzna, Giełozicha, Janów, Jasionowa Dolina, Kamienica, Kizielany, Kizielewszczyzna, Kładziewo, Krasne, Kumiałka, Kuplisk, Kwasówka, Łubianka, Marchelówka, Nowokolno, Nowowola, Nowy Janów, Ostrynka, Podbudno, Podłubianka, Podtrzcianka, Przystawka, Rudawka, Sitawka, Sitkowo, Skidlewo, Soroczy Mostek, Sosnowe Bagno, Studzieńczyna, Szczuki, Teolin, Trofimówka, Trzcianka, Wasilówka and Zielony Gaj.

Neighbouring gminas
Gmina Janów is bordered by the gminas of Czarna Białostocka, Dąbrowa Białostocka, Korycin, Sidra, Sokółka and Suchowola.

References
Polish official population figures 2006

Janow
Sokółka County